Georg Glaeser is an Austrian mathematician, a professor for mathematics and geometry at the University of Applied Arts Vienna. He has written books on computer graphics and biology in relation to mathematics and geometry.

Biography

He studied mathematics and geometry at the TU Wien from 1973 to 1978 from where he also received his doctor's degree in 1980, advised by Walter Wunderlich. After working as a teacher for mathematics and geometry at a higher technical school, he returned to university. He was visiting professor at Princeton University from 1986 to 1987 where he worked with Steve M. Slaby. In 1998 Glaeser obtained his habilitation in computer graphics at the TU Wien and became a full professor at the University of Applied Arts Vienna.

Publications

 3D-Programmierung mit Basic. Teubner, 1986.
 Objektorientiertes Graphik-Programmieren mit der Pascal Unit Supergraph. Teubner, 1992.
 Amiga 3D-Sprinter. Pearson Education, 1993.
 
 Von Pascal zu C/C++. Pearson Education, 1996.
 
 
 Praxis der digitalen Makro- und Naturfotografie. Spektrum, 2008.
 Bilder der Mathematik. Spektrum, 2009.
 with Konrad Polthier: Bilder der Mathematik. 2. Auflage. Spektrum, 2010.
 Wie aus der Zahl ein Zebra wird. Springer Spektrum, 2010.
 Geometry and its Applications in Arts, Nature and Technology. Edition Angewandte, Springer, 2012.
 Nature and Numbers. Edition Angewandte Ambra, de Gruyter, 2014.
 Der mathematische Werkzeugkasten. Spektrum, 2004. 4. Auflage 2014.
 with Hannes F. Paulus: Die Evolution des Auges. Ein Fotoshooting. Springer Spektrum, 2014.
 with Hannes F. Paulus: The Evolution of the Eye. Springer, 2015.
 Geometrie und ihre Anwendungen in Kunst, Natur und Technik. Spektrum, 2005. 3. Auflage 2015.
 
 with Hannes F. Paulus und Werner Nachtigall: Die Evolution des Fliegens. Springer Spektrum, 2017.
 
 
 with Markus Roskar: Maths and Humour. De Gruyter, 2019.
 with Werner Nachtigall: The Evolution and Function of Biological Macrostructures. Springer, 2019.

References 

Homepage, University of Applied Arts Vienna
 

Year of birth missing (living people)
Living people